All-Ukrainian Extraordinary Commission was a Soviet secret police and an affiliation of the Russian Cheka. It was also known as VUChK to distinguish it from its Russian version - VChK. As its parent organization, VUChK was a Bolshevik penal agency that was effectively used to establish "Dictatorship of the proletariat" and was closely associated with the Red Terror.

The commission was created on December 3, 1918, in Kursk and was subordinated to the Provisional Workers-Peasants Government of Ukraine. To accomplish its task under VUChK and local extraordinary commissions were created military formations. Until 1920 it was controlled by the Narkom of Justice and the Supreme Socialist Inspection, after 1920 by the Narkom of Workers Peasants Inspection (Rabkrin).

On March 22, 1922, the commission was reformed into the State Political Administration (DPU) by a resolution of the All-Ukrainian Central Executive Committee.

Chairmen
 December 1918 – March 1919 Isaak Shvarts (appointed from Moscow)
 April 1919 – September 1919 Martin Latsis 
 1921 – March 1922 Vasiliy Mantsev

References

External links
 All-Ukrainian Extraordinary Commission. Ukrainian Soviet Encyclopedia.
 All-Ukrainian Extraordinary Commission. Jurist Encyclopedia (Ukraine).

Ukrainian intelligence agencies
Law enforcement agencies of Ukraine
Defunct intelligence agencies
Soviet intelligence agencies
1918 establishments in Ukraine
Government of Ukraine
1922 disestablishments in Ukraine
Urkaine